The 25th Annual Bengal Film Journalists' Association Awards were held on 1962, honoring the best in Indian cinema in 1961.

Main Awards

Best Indian Films (In Order of Merit) 
 Teen Kanya
 Gunga Jumna
 Punascha
 Madhya Rater Tara
 Saptapadi
 Kanoon
 Char Diwari
 Usne Kaha Tha
 Jis Desh Men Ganga Behti Hai
 Swayambara

Best Director 
Satyajit Ray - Teen Kanya

Best Actor 
Uttam Kumar - Saptapadi

Best Actress 
Suchitra Sen - Saptapadi

Best Actor in Supporting Role 
Anil Chatterjee - Agni Sanskar

Best Actress in Supporting Role 
Manju Dey - Carey Saheber Munshi

Best Cinematographer 
Ajoy Kar - Saptapadi

Best Music Director 
Hemanta Mukherjee - Swaralipi and Ravi Shankar - Sandhayarag

Best Lyricist 
Gouri Prasanna Majumdar - Swaralipi

Best Audiographer 
Bani Dutta - Swaralipi

Best Dialogue 
Santosh Ghosh - Swayambara

Hindi Section

Best Director 
Nitin Bose - Gunga Jumna

Best Actor 
Dilip Kumar - Gunga Jumna

Best Actress 
Vyjayantimala - Gunga Jumna

Best Actor in Supporting Role 
Pran - Jis Desh Men Ganga Behti Hai

Best Actress in Supporting Role 
Nirupa Roy - Chhaya and Indrani Mukherjee - Usne Kaha Tha

Best Music Director 
Naushad - Gunga Jumna

Best Lyricist 
Shakeel Badayuni - Gunga Jumna

Best Cinematographer 
V. Baba Saheb - Gunga Jumna

Best Audiographer 
M. I. Dharmsay - Gunga Jumna

Best Dialogue 
Wazahat Mirza - Gunga Jumna and Rajendra Krishan - Chhaya and S. Khalil - Usne Kaha Tha

Foreign Film Section

Ten Best Films 
 Ben-Hur
 The Apartment
 Kanał
 Girl Seeks Father
 The Millionairess
 On the Beach
 South Pacific
 Pepe
 The Singer Not the Song
 Elmer Gantry

Best Director 
William Wyler - Ben-Hur

Best Actor 
Charlton Heston - Ben-Hur

Best Actress 
Shirley MacLaine - The Apartment

Best Supporting Actor 
Charles Laughton - Under Ten Flags

Best Supporting Actress 
Shirley Jones - Elmer Gantry

References 

Bengal Film Journalists' Association Awards